Valérie Barizza (born 14 August 1967) is a French short track speed skater. She competed at the 1992 Winter Olympics and the 1994 Winter Olympics.

References

External links
 

1967 births
Living people
French female short track speed skaters
Olympic short track speed skaters of France
Short track speed skaters at the 1992 Winter Olympics
Short track speed skaters at the 1994 Winter Olympics
Sportspeople from La Tronche
20th-century French women